Aslı İskit is a Turkish women's handballer, who plays for Thüringer HC and the Turkey national team. The -tall sportswoman plays in the back position.

Early years
Aslı İskit was born to sportspeople parents in Urla district of Izmir Province. She began playing handball at age 11, joining the local club Urla GSK.

Clubs

İzmir Büyükşehir Bld. SK
She began her sport career in 2009 joining İzmir Büyükşehir Belediyesi SK in her hometown, where she played five seasons until 2014. During this time, she took part twice at the Women's EHF Cup (2009–10 and 2010–11) and twice at the Women's EHF Cup Winners' Cup in 2011–12 and 2012–13.

With 161 goals she was the top scorer of the 2012–13 season.

Ardeşen GSK
In the 2014–15 season, she was with the Rize-based team Ardeşen GSK. İskit participated at the Women's EHF Challenge Cup for Ardeşen GSK in 2014–15. She was among the cup's top scorers, however, she was disqualified due to unsportive behaviour at the Last 16 match and suspended for one game. During a 2014–15 league play-off match, she sustained a serious injury, and had to undergo surgery.

In November 2014, she was awarded "Best Playmaker of the Year" by the handball magazine.

Muratpaşa Bld. SK
İskit transferred for the 2015–16 season to Muratpaşa Bld. SK in Antalya. She played at the (2015–16 Women's EHF Cup) for her team.

Kristianstad Handboll
In 2016 İskit transferred to Kristianstad Handboll to play in the top division of women's handball in Sweden.

Kastamonu Bld. GSK
After returning to Turkey im 2018, İskit joined Kastamonu Bld. GSK, and played two seasons in the Turkish Women's Handball Super League.

Thüringer HC
In the beginning of June 2020, İskit signed a two-year contract with the German club Thüringer HC from Erfurt and Bad Langensalza to play in the Handball-Bundesliga. She was recognized as the third best thrower and thus as a powerful backspace player in the past unfinished 2019–20 EHF Cup season.

International
İskit became a member of Turkey girls' U-17 and U-19 teams. She played also for the Turkey women's national beach handball team at international competitions.

She plays for the Turkey women's national handball team. She took part at the 2013 Mediterranean Games, 2014 European Women's Handball Championship, and 2015 World Women's Handball Championship – European qualification matches.

Honours

Club
 Turkish Women's Handball Super League
 Winners (1): 2018–19 
 Runners-up (1): 2010–11 
 Third place (1): 2015–16

Indıvıdual
 Best Playmaker – 2012–13 Turkish Women's Super League with İzmir BB SK.
 Top scorer – 2012–13 Turkish Women's Super League with İzmir BB SK.
 Top scorer – 2014–15 Turkish Women's Super League with Ardeşen GSK.

References 

1993 births
Living people
Sportspeople from İzmir
Turkish female handball players
İzmir Büyükşehir Belediyespor handball players
Ardeşen GSK players
Muratpaşa Bld. SK (women's handball) players
Turkey women's national handball players
Competitors at the 2018 Mediterranean Games
Expatriate handball players
Turkish expatriate sportspeople in Sweden
Turkish expatriate sportspeople in Germany
Mediterranean Games competitors for Turkey
Competitors at the 2022 Mediterranean Games
20th-century Turkish sportswomen
21st-century Turkish sportswomen